A gomesi or busuuti is a colorful floor-length dress.  It is the most commonly used costume for women in Buganda and Busoga.  Traditional male attire is the kanzu.

Origins 

The best scholarship traces the origins of the Gomesi to 1905. The dress was introduced by a Goan designer, Caetano Gomes, then resident in Uganda which was a British Protectorate at the time. The dress did not gain wide use until the wife of Daudi Cwa II of Buganda, the Kabaka or king over Buganda, wore it at her 18-year-old husband's official coranation (he had been kabaka since age 1) in 1914.

Design 

The gomesi is a floor-length, brightly colored cloth dress with a square neckline and short, puffed sleeves. The dress is tied with a sash placed below the waist over the hips. The gomesi has two buttons on the left side of the neckline. Most gomesi are made of silk, cotton, or linen fabric, with silk being the most expensive.  A kikooyi or kanga is tied underneath the linen gomesi to ensure that the fabric does not stick to the body.  A well-made Gomesi can require up to six metres of cloth.

The gomesi can be worn for any occasion, and in the rural areas it's the form of daily dress. Residents of cities and urban areas tend to wear it on special occasions such as funerals, and weddings. The gomesi is worn at wedding ceremonies during the introduction, also known as the Kwanjula. During the Kwanjula, all female members of the groom's family are required to appear dressed in Gomesi.

Singer Alicia Keys wore the gomesi when she visited Uganda in 2007.

See also 
Kanzu
Folk costume

References 

1940s fashion
1950s fashion
20th-century fashion
African clothing
Swahili culture
Dresses
Folk costumes
Ugandan culture